Marius Daniel Urzică (born 30 September 1975 in Toplița, Romania) is a Romanian gymnast. Urzică is an Olympic champion, a three-time world champion  and a three-time European champion on pommel horse. He competed at three Olympic Games, medaling each time on pommel horse (gold Sydney 2000, silver Atlanta 1996 and silver Athens 2004) and contributed to the team bronze in Athens 2004. His unique technique and style of performance have won him the recognition as one of the greatest masters on this piece of apparatus ever, together with Miroslav Cerar and Zoltán Magyar.  Known as "The King of the Pommels" in 2001 he achieved the maximum score of 10.00 on this piece of apparatus at the Glasgow Grand Prix. Two elements in artistic gymnastics, one on pommel horse and one on parallel bars are named after him.

He was the founder of Romanian Golden Team

Skills
Urzicǎ had  difficult routines, which  he always tried  to execute without fault. Among his skills on the pommel horse was a super E element called  "the four Russians on one handle" and a move named after him rated C in the Code of points. On parallel bars he was known for his eponymous salto forward to 1/1 turn to upper arm hang rated E.

References

External links
 
 Marius Urzica at Gymn Forum
 Urzica (Parallel bars Animation)
 
 

1975 births
Living people
People from Toplița
Romanian male artistic gymnasts
Olympic gymnasts of Romania
Gymnasts at the 1996 Summer Olympics
Gymnasts at the 2000 Summer Olympics
Gymnasts at the 2004 Summer Olympics
Olympic gold medalists for Romania
Olympic silver medalists for Romania
Olympic bronze medalists for Romania
World champion gymnasts
Medalists at the World Artistic Gymnastics Championships
European champions in gymnastics
Originators of elements in artistic gymnastics
Olympic medalists in gymnastics
Universiade medalists in gymnastics
Universiade silver medalists for Romania
Medalists at the 1996 Summer Olympics